St. Margaret's Episcopal Church is a historic Carpenter Gothic style Episcopal church building in St. Margaret's, Annapolis, Anne Arundel County, Maryland. Built in 1892 on the brick foundation of a previous church building, it is the fourth building constructed to serve Broad Neck Parish (later known as Westminster Parish), which was established in 1692 as one of the 30 original Anglican parishes in colonial Maryland

St. Margaret's Episcopal Church is still an active parish in the Episcopal Diocese of Maryland. Since 1900, four parish halls have been built on the campus, including the existing parish hall constructed in 1970 and significantly upgraded over the years. Two rectories have been built on the campus and the surviving 1960 rectory became rental property then administrative offices. The parish completed a $4 million formation and pre-school building in 2015.

The Rev. Peter W. Mayer is the current rector.

References

External links
 St. Margaret’s Episcopal Church website
 Annapolis wedding mapper - photo of St. Margaret’s Episcopal Church

Christianity in Annapolis, Maryland
Episcopal church buildings in Maryland
Religious buildings and structures in Annapolis, Maryland
Carpenter Gothic church buildings in Maryland
Churches completed in 1892
19th-century Episcopal church buildings
Churches in Anne Arundel County, Maryland